= Giorgia Gabriele =

Italian model and influencer

Giorgia Gabriele is an Italian model and influencer. She is known for her appearances alongside Gianluca Vacchi, her ex-partner, in their TikTok videos. She founded fashion label Wandering and is the brand's creative director.
